Cristina Georgiana Neagu (born 26 August 1988) is a Romanian professional handballer who plays as a left back for CSM București and the Romanian national team. 

Often considered the best player in the world and rated by many in the sport as the greatest of all time, Neagu is the only female handball player in history to win four IHF World Player of the Year awards (in 2010, 2015, 2016 and 2018). She also won the EHF Player of the Year award in 2017 and 2018 (a record). She has been selected to the All-EHF Champions League All-Star Team seven times (2015–18 and 2020–22).

A prolific goalscorer, Neagu is the European Championship's all-time leader in goals scored (303). She was the 2015 World Championship top-scorer and was named MVP of the tournament. She also finished as the top scorer of the EHF Champions League in the 2014–15, 2017–18 and 2021–22 seasons.

Neagu was given the award of Cetățean de onoare ("Honorary Citizen") of the city of Bucharest in 2017.

Early life
Cristina Neagu is the daughter of Vasilica and Constantin Neagu. She was born in Bucharest, Romania, and grew up in Ghencea district, being the youngest of three siblings. Maria Covaci, local middle school coach, introduced her to handball when she was 12 years old.

Professional career

Injury
During the 2010–11 season, her right shoulder cartilage was damaged. On 10 October 2012, Neagu returned to play in the Romanian Women's Handball League at 605 days (approximately 1 year and 7 months) after injury and after she received long-term treatment in the United States.

She got seriously injured again during a training session in January 2013. Neagu was out for six months after undergoing surgery on the left knee for ruptured cruciate ligaments.

Comeback and later career
After nearly two-and-a-half years of injuries, Neagu again reached the final stage of the Champions League, this time in 2014 with Montenegrin side Budućnost.

On 21 December 2014, she was awarded best left back of the 2014 European Championship. She was also among the tournament top goalscorers, ranking second.

After an outstanding 2013–14 season, she got nominated again for the IHF World Player of the Year Award, but this time she lost to Eduarda Amorim being named second best player in the world with 25.8% of the votes.

Neagu won her first Champions League trophy in 2015 after an outstanding season, topping the goalscorers list alongside Andrea Penezić and being voted the best left back of the competition.

She was named MVP player at the 2015 World Championship in Denmark, where she scored 63 goals – being the top goalscorer in the competition.

Neagu reached the final stage of the Champions League three times (in 2010, 2014 and 2015). She has been a member of the European Championship All-Star Team three times (2010, 2014 and 2016). She received a bronze medal at the 2010 European Championship, being also the top scorer of the competition and having the most assists.

A bad injury sidelined Neagu once again in the final main round match against Hungary at the 2018 European Championship when she was in a commanding position to finish as top scorer. She tore her ACL and had to undergo surgery on her right knee.

Personal life
Neagu is a huge football fan and a big supporter of local team FCSB, and attends their matches at the Arena Națională stadium.

Achievements

National
Romanian National League:
Winner: 2009, 2010, 2011, 2012, 2013, 2018, 2021Silver Medalist: 2007, 2008, 2019, 2022
Romanian Cup:
Winner: 2011, 2018, 2019, 2022Finalist: 2007, 2020, 2021
Romanian Supercup:Winner: 2011, 2017, 2019, 2022
Finalist: 2007, 2018, 2020, 2021
Montenegrin Championship:
Winner: 2014, 2015, 2016, 2017Montenegrin Cup:Winner: 2014, 2015, 2016, 2017

International
EHF Champions League:
Winner: 2015
Finalist: 2010, 2014
Third place: 2009, 2012, 2013, 2018
EHF Cup Winners' Cup:
Finalist: 2008
World Championship:
Bronze Medalist: 2015
European Championship:
Bronze Medalist: 2010
World Youth Championship:
Bronze Medalist: 2006
European Youth Championship:
Silver Medalist: 2005
European Junior Championship:
Bronze Medalist: 2007

Individual
IHF
 4× IHF World Player of the Year: 2010, 2015, 2016, 2018
 IHF World Rookie of the Year: 2009
 World Championship Most Valuable Player: 2015
 World Championship Top Scorer: 2015
 World Championship All-Star Team Left Back: 2015
 World Youth Championship Most Valuable Player: 2006

EHF
 2× EHF Player of the Year: 2017, 2018
 European Championship All-Time Top Scorer (303 goals)
 European Championship Top Scorer: 2010
 European Championship Most Assists: 2010
 4× European Championship All-Star Team Left Back: 2010, 2014, 2016, 2022
 European Youth Championship Most Valuable Player: 2005
 European Junior Championship All-Star Team Left Back: 2007
 Cup Winners' Cup Top Scorer: 2008
 3× Champions League Top Scorer: 2015, 2018, 2022
 7× Champions League All-Star Team Left Back: 2015, 2016, 2017, 2018, 2020, 2021, 2022

National
 6× Romanian Player of the Year: 2009, 2010, 2015, 2016, 2017, 2018
 Romanian Sportsperson of the Year: 2015
 Brașov County Sportsperson of the Year: 2008 
 Top Scorer of the Liga Națională: 2022
 All-Star Left Back of the Liga Națională: 2021
 2× Most Valuable Player of the Liga Națională: 2020, 2021
 3× Liga Națională Best Romanian Player: 2017, 2018, 2019
 Cupa României Final Four Most Valuable Player: 2018
 3× Pro Sport Most Valuable Player of the Liga Națională: 2018, 2020 2021
 3× Pro Sport All-Star Team Left Back of the Liga Națională: 2018, 2020 2021

Other
 3× Handball-Planet World Player of the Year: 2015, 2016, 2018
 6× Handball-Planet All-Star Team Left Back: 2014, 2015, 2016, 2017, 2018 2020
 TV 2 Norway World Player of the Year: 2018
 TV 2 Norway All-Star Team Left Back: 2018
 TV 2 Norway All-Star Team Left Back of the European Championship: 2018
 2× World Cup Most Valuable Player: 2009, 2010
 2× Carpathian Trophy Most Valuable Player: 2017, 2018
 2× Carpathian Trophy Top Scorer: 2006, 2015
 2× Bucharest Trophy All-Star Team Left Back: 2014, 2015

References

External links
 

1988 births
Living people
Sportspeople from Bucharest
Romanian female handball players
Handball players at the 2008 Summer Olympics
Handball players at the 2016 Summer Olympics
Olympic handball players of Romania
SCM Râmnicu Vâlcea (handball) players
Expatriate handball players
Romanian expatriate sportspeople in Montenegro